The Portishead Times is a weekly free newspaper delivered to homes in the Portishead and surrounding villages area of North Somerset, England.
It can also be bought in local news agents.

External links
 Portishead Times website

Newspapers published in Somerset
Portishead, Somerset